Battersea station may refer to the following locations in Battersea, London.

 Battersea railway station, a closed railway station on the West London Extension Railway that operated from 1863 to 1940 
 Battersea Park railway station, a current railway station at the junction of the South London Line and Brighton Main Line
 Battersea Park railway station (1860–1870), a closed railway station on the London, Brighton and South Coast Railway open between 1860 and 1870
 Battersea Park Road railway station, a closed railway station near the existing Battersea Park railway station
 Battersea Power Station tube station, a London Underground station
 Queenstown Road (Battersea) railway station, a current railway station between Vaxuhall and Clapham Junction railway stations
 Battersea Power Station, a former power station and now neighbourhood in south west London